Caquetaia myersi is a species of fish, a large predatory cichlid, which is endemic to the basin of the Amazon River, specifically the Putumayo and Napo rivers of Ecuador and Colombia. The specific name honours the American ichthyologist George S. Myers (1905-1985) of Stanford University, who first noticed that this was a different species of fish but did not formally describe it.  The fish is a protrusible-mouthed predator. The juveniles are omnivorous but the large adults are carnivorous.

References

myersi
Cichlid fish of South America
Freshwater fish of Brazil
Freshwater fish of Colombia
Freshwater fish of Ecuador
Fish of the Amazon basin
Fish described in 1944